The Montreal Express was a member of the National Lacrosse League during the 2002 season. They played at the Molson Center in Montreal, Quebec. They were inactive during the 2003 and 2004 seasons.  The team remained inactive and the franchise was returned to the NLL after the 2004 season. The NLL in turn sold the rights to the franchise to the Minnesota Swarm for the 2005 NLL season.

The first-ever Express game was a record-setting affair, with the Express defeating their expansion cousins the Calgary Roughnecks by a final score of 32-17. New NLL records for most goals by one team (32), most goals by two teams (49), and most penalty minutes by two teams (155) were all set in this game.

All time Record

2001–02 schedule

Exp
Defunct National Lacrosse League teams
Lacrosse clubs established in 2002
Lacrosse clubs disestablished in 2004
2002 establishments in Quebec
2004 disestablishments in Quebec